Sierra-at-Tahoe is a ski and snowboard resort in Twin Bridges, California south of Lake Tahoe. Sierra-at-Tahoe is approximately 16 miles (26 km) south of Stateline, Nevada and 12 miles south of South Lake Tahoe on U.S. Route 50 and is contained within the Eldorado National Forest. Sierra-at-Tahoe (often shortened to "Sierra") is a medium sized ski area in the Lake Tahoe region, and is well known for being a more family oriented resort and also having a high annual snowfall. Sierra-at-Tahoe's terrain is 25 percent beginner, 50 percent Intermediate, and 25 percent advanced.

The majority of the ski resorts in the Lake Tahoe region are on the northern end of the lake, near Truckee, California and Reno, Nevada. Sierra-at-Tahoe, Kirkwood and Heavenly are located south of the lake, approximately 75 miles (120 km) from Reno. It is common for visitors to ski amongst these three resorts when staying in southern Lake Tahoe area and not venture to the northern lake resorts such as Palisades Tahoe, Northstar at Tahoe, Sugar Bowl, which are approximately 50-70 miles away. This resort also serves many communities around the eastern Sacramento region as it is in close proximity being located before the road summit on U.S. Route 50. The high schools of El Dorado County all use the resort for training, and competitions for their snowboard and ski teams.

History
Sierra-at-Tahoe Resort was started in 1946 by brothers Ray and Floyd Barrett as Sierra Ski Ranch, further down U.S. Route 50. It was sold to Vern Sprock in 1953. In 1968, the "Ranch" was moved to its present location when the California Department of Transportation began widening U.S. Route 50. The Sprock family operated the resort until 1993 when the resort was sold to Fibreboard Corporation. Fibreboard updated many areas of the resort, including changing the name to Sierra-at-Tahoe Resort. Booth Creek Ski Resorts purchased Sierra-at-Tahoe in 1996. CNL Lifestyle acquired Sierra-at-Tahoe and Northstar California from Booth Creek in 2007. Sierra-at-Tahoe was among 15 resorts sold by CNL to Och-Ziff Capital Management in 2016. Booth Creek continues to operate Sierra-at-Tahoe.
In August 2021 the Sierra-at-Tahoe resort was severely burned by the Caldor Fire and was unable to open by the typical opening date in late 2021. In December 2022, the Sierra-at-Tahoe resort was able to open up in full operation however it has been severely denuded of its tree cover on the lower mountain. More tree removal is expected in the future,  and the resort is still undergoing some operational rebuilding related to the fire as well.

Ski lifts
The Easy Rider, Grandview, and West Bowl Express ski lifts are the high speed quads built by Doppelmayr, the triple chair lift is the Puma built by Yan Lifts, and the 5 doubles are the Tahoe King, El Dorado, Rock Garden, Short Stuff, and Nob Hill all built by Yan Lifts. The Tahoe King and Puma are auxiliary lifts of the Grandview Express and West Bowl Express respectively, and run if crowd levels warrant their usage. The oldest lift in operation is the Nob Hill double chair installed in 1968, and many (or all) of the double chairs were installed in the 1970's to about 1985 and are still in operation. The high speed quads started their installation around 1989, with the current high speed quad lifts being installed in 1996.

References

External links
Sierra-at-Tahoe Resort official web site
Booth Creek Ski Resorts, Inc.
Vern Sprock Obituary, Lake Tahoe News

Buildings and structures in El Dorado County, California
Ski areas and resorts in California
Tourist attractions in El Dorado County, California
1946 establishments in California